Mohebb-e Pain (also Romanized as Moḩebb-e Pā’īn; also known as Kalāteh-ye Moḩebb-e Pā’īn) is a village in Qaen Rural District, in the Central District of Qaen County, South Khorasan Province, Iran. At the 2006 census, its population was 24, in 6 families.

References 

Populated places in Qaen County